Tăng Thanh Hà (born Tăng Thị Thanh Hà; October 24, 1986 in Gò Công, Tiền Giang, Vietnam) is a Vietnamese actress and model. She is Toshiba's brand ambassador to Vietnam.

Early life
She was born on October 24, 1986, in Gò Công, Tiền Giang in a family of Chinese descent.  When her family business did not go well, she helped her mother out making ends meet: At the age of 11, Tang woke early to assist with preparing food for later distribution to customers. At this time her mother enrolled her in night acting classes at Idecaf.

Career
When she was 16, director Lưu Trọng Ninh asked her to portray Trang in the movie  Dốc tình. Although only a minor role, Thanh Ha caught the attention of the film world. She went on to play Mộng Cầm in  Hàn Mặc Tử - a film about the celebrated Vietnamese poet -, and won critical acclaim. She was also cast in Hương phù sa in the role of Út Nhỏ and in several ads. She won the Best lead actress award from the Ho Chi Minh City Television in 2006. At this point, however, she left acting to study hotel administration in Singapore just as she became recognized as an up-and-coming actress on television and on the big screen. Upon returning to Vietnam the next year, she was given the leading role in the multi-episode television drama Bỗng dưng muốn khóc. In 2008, she landed a role in Đẹp từng centimét. At the end of 2009 she was selected by director Nguyễn Phan Quang Bình to be in [[The Floating Lives (film)|Cánh đồng bất tận (The Floating Lives)]] based on a novel of the same name by female writer Nguyễn Ngọc Tư.

Awards
Best lead actress of 2006 according to  Ho Chi Minh City Television - the HTV AwardsVietnamese Best Forum
Best dressed actress of 2008 according to Mốt magazine VN
Best-liked TV actress during 2008-2009 (as Trúc in the movie Bỗng Dưng Muốn Khóc)

 Personal life 
She married Louis Nguyễn, a Vietnamese-Filipino entrepreneur, in November 2012 after three-and-a-half years of dating.

Filmography

Television

Movies
 Đẹp từng centimét: 2009
 The Floating Lives (Cánh đồng bất tận): 2010
 The Lady Assassin (Mỹ Nhân Kế): 2013

Plays
 Người phố Hoa''

References

External links

Tăng Thanh Hà: "Đừng hỏi tôi về tình yêu"
Hà Tăng đẹp như mỹ nữ trong tranh

Vietnamese film actresses
Vietnamese television actresses
Living people
1986 births
Vietnamese female models
People from Tiền Giang province
Hoa people
21st-century Vietnamese women